Acraea alicia is a butterfly in the family Nymphalidae. It is found in the Democratic Republic of the Congo, Burundi, Uganda, Kenya, Tanzania, Malawi and Zambia.

Description

A. alicia E. Sharpe (56 b). Markings of the upper surface yellow-red, only at the inner margin of the hindwing sulphur-yellow; the hindmarginal spot of the fore wing completely covers the base of cellule 2 and is continued on both sides of the median nearly to the base, covering the posterior half of the cell and the anterior part of cellule 1 b; hindwing above triangularly black at the base, in the female with light marginal spots. Hindwing beneath with light yellow ground-colour, at the base with black dots but without red spots or streaks; its marginal band deep black without light stripes and with no spots except the white marginal ones. Cameroons; Ruwenzori; Uganda; British East Africa; Kilimandjaro. - female ab. tenelloides Poult Subapical band of the forewing yellow; median band of the hind wing very broad and light yellow, the base but little black; marginal band on the underside of the hindwing light grey-yellow. British East Africa: Kikuyu. -female ab. cabiroides Poult. Above similar to the male but with marginal spots on the hindwing; hindwing beneath with broader marginal band in which the marginal spots are bounded by distinct black, proximally elongated lines. British East Africa: Kikuyu.

Subspecies
Acraea alicia alicia (Democratic Republic of the Congo, Burundi, Uganda, Kenya, northern Tanzania, Malawi, Zambia)
Acraea alicia mbulu Kielland, 1990 (Tanzania: northern highlands)
Acraea alicia uzungwae Kielland, 1990 (Tanzania: southern highlands)

Biology
The habitat consists of montane forests and farmland.

Taxonomy
Acraea alicia is a member of the Acraea bonasia species group; see Acraea.

Classification of Acraea by Henning, Henning & Williams, Pierre. J. & Bernaud
Hyalites (group bonasia) Henning, 1993 
Acraea (Actinote) (subgroup bonasia) Pierre & Bernaud, 2013
Telchinia (Telchinia) Henning & Williams, 2010 
Acraea (Actonote)   groupe serena  sub group  bonasia Pierre & Bernaud, 2014

References

External links

 Images representing  Acraea alicia at Bold
Die Gross-Schmetterlinge der Erde 13: Die Afrikanischen Tagfalter. Plate XIII 56 b

Butterflies described in 1890
alicia
Butterflies of Africa